First-seeded Helen Wills defeated Phoebe Holcroft Watson 6–4, 6–2 in the final to win the women's singles tennis title at the 1929 U.S. National Championships. It was her sixth U.S. National singles title and her third in a row.

Seeds
The tournament used a list of eight U.S. players and six foreign players for seeding the women's singles event. Helen Wills is the champion; others show in brackets the round in which they were eliminated.

  Helen Wills (champion)
  Helen Jacobs (semifinals)
  Edith Cross (quarterfinals)
  Molla Mallory (semifinals)
  May Sutton Bundy (second round)
  Mary Greef (quarterfinals)
  Anna McCune Harper (third round)
  Marjorie Gladman (third round)

  Betty Nuthall (quarterfinals)
  Phoebe Holcroft Watson (finalist)
  Peggy Saunders Michell (quarterfinals)
  Phyllis Covell (third round)
  Dorothy Shepherd-Barron (quarterfinals)
  Olive Wade (first round)

Draw

Final eight

References

1929
1929 in women's tennis
1929 in American women's sports
Women's Singles